Cyperus regiomontanus is a species of sedge that is native to parts of Central America.

See also 
 List of Cyperus species

References 

regiomontanus
Plants described in 1895
Flora of Colombia
Flora of Costa Rica
Flora of Honduras
Flora of Mexico
Taxa named by Nathaniel Lord Britton